Anton Alekseyevich Avdeyev (also spelled Avdeev, ; born 8 September 1986) is a Russian left-handed épée fencer and 2009 individual world champion.

Medal Record

World Championship

European Championship

References

External links
  (archive)
  (archive)
 
 
 

1986 births
Living people
People from Voskresensk
Russian male épée fencers
Olympic fencers of Russia
Fencers at the 2008 Summer Olympics
Fencers at the 2016 Summer Olympics
Sportspeople from Moscow Oblast
21st-century Russian people